The Shire of Wyndham East Kimberley is one of the four local government areas in the Kimberley region of northern Western Australia, covering an area of  at Western Australia's northeastern corner. The Shire's seat of government was originally in Wyndham but now in the town of Kununurra, which is home to over half of the Shire's permanent population of around 7,000 (ABS 2016), while a council office is located at Wyndham.

El Questro Wilderness Park, Drysdale River National Park, Lake Argyle, the Argyle diamond mine and about half of Gibb River Road are located within the Shire's boundaries.

History

The East Kimberley Road District was gazetted on 10 February 1887. It was renamed as the Wyndham Road District on 4 September 1896. On 1 July 1961, it became the Shire of Wyndham–East Kimberley following the passage of the Local Government Act 1960, which reformed all remaining road districts into shires.

The early 1960s establishment of Kununurra and the Ord River Irrigation Area eventually led to moving the seat of local government from Wyndham to Kununurra, which by the 1980s had become a larger centre of population.

Many large cattle stations exist in the area including Argyle Downs which was established by Patrick Durack and his brother Michael in 1882.

Council

Current composition
The Shire of Wyndham East Kimberley has nine (9) councillors elected to represent the whole of the Shire.

List of former and current presidents
 D Menzel (2017–present)
 B Parker (2015–2016)
 J Moulden (2011–2015)
 F Mills (2008–2011)
 M Pucci (2005–2008)
 B Johnson (2001–2005)
 M Middap (1997-2001)
 C Wootton (1994-1997)
 D Chapman (1992-1994)
 B Raicevic (1990-1992)
 S Bradley (1985-1990)
 M Trowbridge (1983-1985)
 P Reid (1978-1983)

Administration and governance
Ordinary council meetings alternate between the council chambers at the Kununurra and Wyndham Shire Offices, which are also the location of the Shire's administrative activities. Customer services are also available at Kununurra and Wyndham Shire Offices.

2015–2016 council controversy
In 2016, the Shire of Wyndham East Kimberley Council's power was temporarily transferred to Commissioner Ron Yuryevich (former Mayor of Kalgoorlie). The appointment of a Commissioner was as a result of ongoing dysfunction between the elected councillors with allegations of bullying and undeclared financial interests reported to the Local Government Minister.  The Shire was issued with a Show Cause Notice under the Local Government Act 1995 in May 2016, requiring elected members and senior staff to take part in mediation. Mediation was declared untenable by the mediator on 2 August 2016 and the shire was issued with a second Show Cause Notice by the Local Government Minister, notifying his intention to suspend council.  Following the resignation of five councillors after the budget adoption in September 2016, the council was left with no quorum and was therefore unable to conduct its business.  As a result of these resignations, the Governor of Western Australia made an order under the Local Government Act 1995 declaring all offices vacant and required the appointment of a Commissioner in place of council until the Ordinary Elections in October 2017.

Council elections were held in October 2017 and a new council of 9 councillors sworn in.

Population

Towns and localities
The towns and localities of the Shire of Wyndham-East Kimberley with population and size figures based on the most recent Australian census:

(* indicates locality is only partially located within this shire)

Indigenous communities
Indigenous communities in the Shire of Wyndham-East Kimberley:
 Dodnun community
 Kalumburu
 Kandiwal community
 Ngallagunda Community
 Pago Community
 Woolah (Doon Doon) Community

Protected areas
Protected areas within the Shire of Wyndham-East Kimberley:
National Parks
 Drysdale River
 Lawley River
 Mirima
 Mitchell River
 Prince Regent

Marine Parks
 North Lalang-garram Marine Park
 Lalang-garram / Camden Sound Marine Park 
 Lalang-garram / Horizontal Falls Marine Park (Also covers areas in the Shire of Derby West Kimberley)

Nature Reserves & Conservation Parks
 Parry Lagoons Nature Reserve
 Pelican Island Nature Reserve
 Point Spring Nature Reserve
 Ord River Nature Reserve
 Barrbem Conservation Park
 Darram Conservation Park
 Goomig Conservation Park
 Jemarnde-wooningim Conservation Park
 Laterite Conservation Park
 Mijing Conservation Park
 Ngamoowalem Conservation Park

Notable councillors
 Susan Bradley, former councillor and Shire president – Awarded an Order of Australia Medal for her contribution to the Kimberley community

Heritage-listed places

As of 2023, 120 places are heritage-listed in the Shire of Wyndham–East Kimberley, of which three are on the State Register of Heritage Places.

References

External links
 
 Official Facebook Page Shire of Wyndham East Kimberley
  . Department of Indigenous Affairs (DIA).
 Kununurra Historical Society Inc. Archive, Library, Museum & Research website with history and links to images of the Shire.

Wyndham